Jaswinder "Jazz" Juttla (born 2 August 1977) is a Scottish former footballer who played for Greenock Morton. Although his career at senior level was short, he is notable as being one of very few people of Scottish Asian descent to have been involved in professional football in Scotland.

Career
Born in Glasgow and raised in Bearsden, with grandparents originating from the Punjab, India, Juttla came through the youth system at Rangers, winning the Scottish Youth Cup in 1995 and the Glasgow Cup in 1996 alongside future Scotland captain Barry Ferguson, but he did not make a senior appearance for the club, with several experienced domestic and foreign players ahead in the queue for selection (Barry Robson, who later became an international, was another in that Rangers youth squad who left without playing a match).

In 1997, having been released by Rangers, Juttla signed for second-tier Greenock Morton, making his debut aged 20 but only featuring in ten league matches in his first season at Cappielow and eight in the second.

In 1999, Juttla left professional football to pursue a career as a police officer. He continued to play in the Junior grade for several years, firstly with Johnstone Burgh then Cumbernauld United before retiring in 2007. He was named by contemporaries in their 'dream teams' as the best player in his position they had encountered at that level. In his career in law enforcement, he became a detective in the Police Scotland force.

See also
 British Asians in association football

References

Living people
1971 births
People from Bearsden
Footballers from Glasgow
Scottish footballers
Scottish people of Indian descent
Scottish people of Punjabi descent
Scottish police officers
Association football defenders
Scottish Football League players
Scottish Junior Football Association players
Rangers F.C. players
Greenock Morton F.C. players
Johnstone Burgh F.C. players
Cumbernauld United F.C. players
British Asian footballers
British sportspeople of Indian descent
Officers in Scottish police forces
Police Scotland officers